Pasquier Grenier (1447–1493), was a Flemish tapestry weaver who kept a workshop in Tournai.

He was active making and selling tapestries from his workshop in the late 15th century, which is first registered in 1477. His son Jean continued his workshop after he died. He partially financed the reconstruction of the Church of Saint Quentin, Tournai where he is also buried.

References

External links
The Gubbio Studiolo and its conservation, volumes 1 & 2, from The Metropolitan Museum of Art Libraries (fully available online as PDF), which contains material on Pasquier Grenier (see index)

1447 births
1493 deaths
Flemish tapestry artists
Artists from Tournai
Burgundian Netherlands businesspeople